Arnimal was an 18th century leading Kashmiri Brahmin female poet.

Life 
Arnimal was born in Palhalan during the eighteenth century. She married Munshi Bhawani Das Kachroo, a poet from Rainawari and an erudite Persian scholar in the court of Jumma Khan, the Afghan Governor of Kashmir between 1788 and 1792.

See also 
 Habba Khatoon
Lal Ded

External links
Four woman poets including Arnimal

Kashmiri poets
Kashmiri people
18th-century Indian poets